John Henry Smeaton (born 31 August 1948) is a former Australian cricket umpire. He stood in one Test match in 2001.

Smeaton umpired 42 first-class matches between 1996 and 2004, most of them in Hobart. He umpired the last three days of the Test match between Australia and New Zealand in Hobart in November 2001, replacing Steve Davis during the match after Davis was injured. Rain limited play on the three days to 105.2 overs, and the match was drawn.

See also
 List of Test cricket umpires

References

1948 births
Living people
Australian Test cricket umpires
Sportspeople from Melbourne